The BelAZ 75600 is a series of off-highway, ultra class haul trucks developed and manufactured in Belarus by OJSC "Belarusian Autoworks" specifically for transportation of loosened rocks on technological haul roads at open-pit mining sites worldwide under different climatic conditions.

The trucks have a diesel-electric transmission. Engines are Cummins QSK78 (model 75600) or MTU 20V4000 (model 75601) generating 2610 or 2800 kW respectively.

See also
 BelAZ
 BelAZ 75710

Link
Official Website

References

Haul trucks
75600